(Hakka: Tshòng-tin), also known as Tingzhou or Tingchow, is a county in western Fujian province, People's Republic of China. The majority of the population belongs to the Hakka people and speaks Changting dialect, a dialect of Hakka Chinese. The Changting dialect is mutually unintelligible with the Meixian dialect, which is another Hakka language spoken in Guangdong.

The county seat is the town of Tingzhou.

History

Pre-modern era

Changting was originally the name of a prefecture (called Tingzhou in imperial times), established in the second year of the Republic of China - 1913.

Jiangxi-Fujian Soviet

During the early stages of the Chinese Civil War, this prefecture was the economic and financial centre of the Chinese Soviet Republic (Jiangxi-Fujian soviet). Tens of thousands of people from Changting joined the Chinese Red Army but not many survived the Long March.

Post-Mao era
With the founding of the People's Republic of China, the prefecture was redesignated "Longyan" and its government was moved down to Xinluo. Changting has since been the name of a county only, within the municipal region of Longyan.

With the prosperity of road and railway transportation and more and more dams built along the river, Ting River gradually lost its advantage as a vital transportation means. Changting, once an important concentration place for travellers and goods, became isolated by big mountains. Changting lost its place as the center of western Fujian and became one of the poorest counties in Fujian province.

Today, the situation has improved a lot with first railroad in service in 2005 and first highway in service at the end of 2007.

Education
Changting No.1 Middle School in Tingzhou

Geography

Changting borders Liancheng County to the east, Wuping and Shanghang counties to the south (all in Longyan municipality), Sanming municipality's Ninghua County to the north, Ganzhou municipality's Ruijin City in Jiangxi province to the west.

Located in the southern end of the Wuyi Mountains, Changting belongs to subtropical zone. The region enjoys abundant precipitation as the warm maritime air meets the cool air in the mountains, generating a large amount of rainfall.

Climate

Administration
The county executive, legislature and judiciary are in Tingzhou Town, together with the CPC and PSB branches.

Towns (镇, zhen)
 Tingzhou (汀州) - the county seat
 Guanqian
 Hetian (河田)
 Gucheng
 Tongfang
 Xinqiao
 Nanshan
 Zhuotian
 Sidu
 Datong
 Tufang

Township (乡, xiang)
 Anjie
 Cewu
 Sanzhou
 Tiechang
 Yanggu
 Xuancheng
 Hongshan

Notable natives
(i.e., of Tingzhou/Changting Prefecture and of PRC's Changting County):
 Yang Chengwu, 1914-2004 Revolutionarian and General of People's Liberation Army
 Chen Pixian, 1916-1995  Revolutionarian and CPC official
 Fu Lianzhang, 1894-1968 Christian, practitioner of western medicine, Long March veteran, PRC Health Ministry official and Cultural Revolution victim.
 Bei Cun (1965-), avant-garde Christian novelist.
 Chen Hong (1979-), number 1 badminton player on the world ranking list from 2002 to 2003.

See also
Hakka people
Hakka (language)

References

External links
Official website

County-level divisions of Fujian
Longyan